After Dark 2 is a compilation album featuring artists from the Italians Do It Better label. The album was released on May 17, 2013, and produced by Johnny Jewel. It is a sequel to the 2007 album After Dark. Artists and bands featured on the album include Glass Candy, Desire, Chromatics, Mirage, Appaloosa, Symmetry, Twisted Wires, Farah, and Mike Simonetti.

Track listing

References

2013 compilation albums
Record label compilation albums
Sequel albums